Robert Klein is an American comedian and actor.

Robert Klein may also refer to:

Robert Klein (Medal of Honor) (1848–1931), United States Navy sailor

Robert N. Klein II, property developer and stem cell advocate
R. Martin Klein (born 1957), American voice actor
Bob Klein (born 1947), American football tight end
Robert Klein (gymnast) (1925–2000), German Olympic gymnast
Robert G. Klein (born c. 1948), Justice of the Supreme Court of Hawaii

See also
Bob Kline (1909–1987), American baseball pitcher
Robert Kleine (born 1941), State Treasurer of Michigan